Pope Leo was the name of thirteen Roman Catholic Popes:
Pope Leo I (the Great) (440–461)
Pope Leo II (682–683)
Pope Leo III (795–816)
Pope Leo IV (847–855)
Pope Leo V (903)
Pope Leo VI (928)
Pope Leo VII (936–939)
Pope Leo VIII (964–965)
Pope Leo IX (1049–1054)
Pope Leo X (1513–1521)
Pope Leo XI (1605)
Pope Leo XII (1823–1829)
Pope Leo XIII (1878–1903)

Leo